Nancy Higgins (born 23 April 1954) is a Canadian rower. She competed in the women's eight event at the 1976 Summer Olympics.

References

1954 births
Living people
Canadian female rowers
Olympic rowers of Canada
Rowers at the 1976 Summer Olympics
Sportspeople from Oshawa